Megachile squamosa is a species of bee in the family Megachilidae. It was described by Rebmann and Blaine H. Goodposts in 1970.

References

Squamosa
Insects described in 1970